Villa Constitución Airport  is a small airfield located  3 km North of the central business district (CBD) of Ciudad Constitución, Baja California Sur, Mexico.  It is used for agricultural aviation purposes.

External links
VIB at World Airports Codes.
VIB at flightstats.com
VIB at KLS2.com

Airports in Baja California Sur
Comondú Municipality